Il faut du temps is an album by the singer Dalida. It was originally released in 1972.

Track listing
 "Il faut du temps"
 "Ma mélo-mélodie"
 "Parle plus bas (Le Parrain)"
 "Avec le temps"
 "Jésus kitsch"
 "Pour ne pas vivre seul"
 "Et puis c'est toi"
 "Que reste-t-il de nos amours" (1ère version)
 "L'amour qui venait du froid"
 "Mamina"

Singles
1972 Mamina
1972 Jésus kitsch / Ma mélo-mélodie
1972 Le Parrain : Parle plus bas

References
 Dalida Official Website

External links
 Dalida Official Website "Discography" section

Dalida albums
1972 albums